Mary Queen of Scots is the second and final album by Eugenius, released in 1994.

Several songs on the album were released on singles in 1993. The title track was featured as a B-side to the non-LP single "Caesar's Vein", with "Easter Bunny" being released as the follow-up single. The track "Blue Above the Rooftops" was released as a single to support the album in 1994. The track "Home Sick" is only featured on the American release of the album and elsewhere was used as a B-side. The B-side "Green Bed" from the "Caesar's Vein" EP also likely comes from the album sessions.

Critical reception
Dave Thompson, in Alternative Rock, called the album "stronger, more focussed, certainly brighter and cleaner" than the debut.

Track listing
All songs written by Eugene Kelly.

 "Pebble/Shoe" - 3:23
 "On the Breeze" - 3:15
 "Blue Above the Rooftops" - 3:00
 "The Moon's a Balloon" - 4:53
 "Mary Queen of Scots" - 4:59
 "Easter Bunny" - 5:27
 "Let's Hibernate" - 3:40
 "Friendly High" - 4:48
 "River Clyde Song" - 3:10
 "Tongue Rock" - 2:38
 "Home Sick" (extra track on US Edition) - 4:34
 "Fake Digit" - 4:17
 "Love, Bread and Beers" - 3:07

Personnel
Eugene Kelly - vocals, guitar
Gordon Keen - guitar
Raymond Boyle - bass
Roy Lawrence - drums
Cassell Webb - additional keyboards and backing vocals

References

1994 albums
Eugenius (band) albums
Atlantic Records albums